Šalamenci is a village in the Municipality of Puconci in the Prekmurje region of Slovenia.

Notable people
Notable people that were born or lived in Šalamenci include:
János Fliszár (1856–1947), writer, poet, and journalist

References

External links
Šalamenci on Geopedia

Populated places in the Municipality of Puconci